Larry Garrison is President of SilverCreek Entertainment in Los Angeles. He is an executive producer in film and television, a journalist, an author, an actor, and a publicist who works with magazine shows, print and radio. His company has produced and brokered news stories for ABC News, NBC News and other news media organizations.

Books
His books include The New York Times best seller Aruba: The Tragic Untold Story of Natalee Holloway and Corruption in Paradise, his memoir The NewsBreaker, and Breaking Into Acting for Dummies.
Son of A Grifter: The Twisted Tale of Sante and Kenny Kimes, the Most Notorious Con Artists in America, won an Edgar Award for best Fact Crime book in 2002.

References

External links
The NewsBreaker (Official site)
SilverCreek Entertainment

Living people
Year of birth missing (living people)